Stora Essingen is an island and a district in the Kungsholmen borough in Stockholm, Sweden. It is located adjacent to Lilla Essingen on Lake Mälaren. Both Essingen Islands are mainly residential areas. Stora Essingen is scattered with private houses and apartment buildings. The Essingeleden motorway, part of European route E4, passes along a section of the eastern shore. The Tvärbanan light rail passes near the eastern shore and has one stop on the island.

History
The increasing number of summer residences built on Stora Essingen during the 18th century were during the early 20th century gradually transformed into permanent residences. There was added momentum in sales after 1929 when Essingebron bridge was built connecting Stora Essingen to Lilla Essingen.

Bridges of Stora Essingen
From Lilla Essingen
Essingebron, two parallel bridges, one for the motorway, another for local road traffic
From the mainland, southeast:
Gröndalsbron, two parallel bridges, one for the motorway, another for the light rail line
From the mainland, northwest:
Alviksbron, for the light rail, pedestrians, and bicycles

References

Islands of Stockholm
Districts of Stockholm
Islands of Mälaren